The 2022 NASCAR All-Star Race (XXXVIII) was a NASCAR Cup Series stock car exhibition race that was held on May 22, 2022, at Texas Motor Speedway in Fort Worth, Texas. Contested over 140 laps, extended from 125 laps due to overtime finishes in two stages, it was the second exhibition race of the 2022 NASCAR Cup Series season.

Report

Background

The All-Star Race is open to race winners from last season through the 2022 AdventHealth 400 at Kansas Speedway, all previous All-Star race winners, NASCAR Cup champions who had attempted to qualify for every race in 2022, the winner of each stage of the All-Star Open, and the winner of the All-Star fan vote are eligible to compete in the All-Star Race.

Entry list
 (R) denotes rookie driver.
 (i) denotes driver who is ineligible for series driver points.

NASCAR All Star Open

NASCAR All-Star Race

Practice

Open Practice results

All-Star Race Practice results

Qualifying (Open)

Open qualifying results

Qualifying (All-Star Race)
Kyle Busch scored the pole for the race by beating Ryan Blaney in the final round of the Pit Crew Challenge.

All-Star Race qualifying results

NASCAR All Star Open

NASCAR All Star Open results

NASCAR All-Star Race

NASCAR All-Star Race results

Overtime controversy
At the race's original final lap, Ricky Stenhouse Jr. hit the wall coming out of turn two. NASCAR brought up a caution, which meant because the NASCAR All-Star Race rules for the year required the race end under green, meant the race would go to overtime. Ryan Blaney, who had crossed the finish line at the time of the incident, assumed the race had ended without an overtime and opened his window net in preparation for celebrations, which, because the race went to overtime, is considered a safety violation which would result in a black flag, but NASCAR allowed Blaney to retain his lead for the overtime restart, retaining his lead throughout to win the race; Blaney claimed that his window net was back up during the overtime period. Denny Hamlin criticized NASCAR for both the caution and allowing Blaney with a blatant safety violation to keep his spot in first without the help of his pit crew (a sentiment echoed by fans following the race), while NASCAR senior vice president Scott Miller admitted that the caution was called prematurely and that they had "no way for us to know" if Blaney managed to securely install the window net after he originally opened it.

In response to the controversy, NASCAR pledged to increase the amount of communication between the race control, race director, and senior vice president of competition in calling cautions to prevent such inconsistent calls from reoccurring.

Media

Television
Fox Sports was the television broadcaster of the race in the United States. Lap-by-lap announcer, Mike Joy, Clint Bowyer, and Larry McReynolds called the race from the broadcast booth. Actor Frankie Muniz joined Joy, Bowyer, and McReynolds in the booth for the Open. Jamie Little and Vince Welch handled pit road for the television side.

Radio
Motor Racing Network (MRN) continued their longstanding relationship with Speedway Motorsports to broadcast the race on radio. The lead announcers for the race's broadcast were Alex Hayden and Jeff Striegle. The network also had two announcers on each side of the track: Dave Moody in turns 1 and 2 and Mike Bagley in turns 3 and 4. Steve Post and Kim Coon were the network's pit lane reporters. The network's broadcast was simulcasted on Sirius XM NASCAR Radio.

References

NASCAR All-Star Race
NASCAR All-Star Race
NASCAR All-Star Race
NASCAR races at Texas Motor Speedway
NASCAR All-Star Race
NASCAR controversies